Parliamentary elections were held in the Kingdom of Dalmatia in 1895.

Results

References

Bibliography

Elections in Croatia
Dalmatia
1895 in Croatia
Elections in Austria-Hungary
History of Dalmatia
Election and referendum articles with incomplete results